Father has been used as both title and honorific in various languages, synonyms and historical contexts. It may sometimes denote a title of authority or of honour.

List of uses of "father" in various languages

By culture and/or language
 Ab (Semitic)
 Bwana ("our father"), from Swahili, meaning an important person or safari leader
 Abu in Kunya (Arabic), used as epithet for "father of X"
 Baba, mark of respect in:
 Indian honorific Hindu and Sikh
 Baba (honorific) in Persian language
 In Malaysia as an honorific of respect to address Chinese people born in the British Straits Settlements
 Batko, a Ukrainian honorific meaning "father"
 List of people considered father or mother of a field
 Founding father
 Father of the Nation/Father of the Country
 Pater Patriae
 Fathers of Confederation
 Founding fathers of the European Union
 Founding Fathers of the United States
 Pater familias (Latin), title for head of household in Ancient Rome

Personifications
 Father Time
 Father Christmas
 Ded Moroz ("Father Frost")

By religion
 God the Father

Buddhism
 Abbot (Buddhism) a title for a monk who holds the position of administrator of a Buddhist monastery or Buddhist temple

Christianity
 Patriarch (Greek, literally "father ruler") as a title for the primate of a Christian denomination
 Pope
 Church Fathers
 Abbot, an ecclesiastical title given to the male head of a monastery 
 Father,  as a honorific for a priest
 Aboona ("our father") in Syriac language
 Abuna ("our father") in Amharic and Tigrinya

Society-related lists
Fatherhood
Honorifics
Cultural lists
Etiquette lists
Lists of nicknames
Translation-related lists
Linguistics lists

See also 

 List of people considered father or mother of a field